Alles in Ordnung – Mit dem Wahnsinn auf Streife (All Right - On Patrol with Madness) is a German "mockumentary" television series directed by  and aired on the TV station ProSieben since 2005. It is a satire of police series and follows the same concept as Reno 911!.

See also
List of German television series

External links
 

German comedy television series
2006 German television series debuts
2007 German television series endings
ProSieben original programming
German documentary television series
Mockumentary television series
German-language television shows